The Museum of National Yang Ming Chiao Tung University is a museum about the history of the National Yang Ming Chiao Tung University in East District, Hsinchu City, Taiwan. The museum is located at the National Chiao Tung University.

History
The museum was established in 2004.

Architecture
The museum has the following galleries:
 Gallery of University Presidents
 Chu-Ming Memorial Room
 University History Area
 The Campus
 Semiconductor Exhibition Area
 Computer Exhibition Area
 Special Exhibition Area

Exhibitions
There are over 4,000 photos of staffs and students, alumni, events of the school's history, scenes of the campuses and activities held in the university.

See also
 List of museums in Taiwan
 National Chiao Tung University

References

External links
 

2004 establishments in Taiwan
Museums established in 2004
University museums in Taiwan
Museums in Hsinchu

Museum of National Yang Ming Chiao Tung University